The 1915 election for Mayor of Los Angeles took place on May 4, 1915, with a run-off election on June 1, 1915. Charles E. Sebastian was elected.

Results

Primary election

General election

References and footnotes

External links
 Office of the City Clerk, City of Los Angeles

1915
1915 California elections
Los Angeles
1910s in Los Angeles